The 1926 County Championship was the 33rd officially organised running of the County Championship. Lancashire County Cricket Club won the championship title for the third time.

Final placings were still decided by calculating the percentage of points gained against possible points available. The matches Yorks vs Notts, Derbys vs Leics, Northants vs Sussex were abandoned without a ball being bowled.

Table
 Five points were awarded for a win.
 Three points were awarded for "winning" the first innings of a drawn match.
 Two points were awarded for "tying" the first innings of a drawn match.
 One points were awarded for "losing" the first innings of a drawn match.
 Final placings were decided by calculating the percentage of possible points.

Essex and Somerset were awarded 2.5 points each for a tie after the match ended with scores tied and with Essex having one wicket remaining.

References

1926 in English cricket
County Championship seasons